Midgard Peak is a  mountain summit located in the Valhalla Ranges of the Selkirk Mountains in British Columbia, Canada. Midgard Peak is the third-highest point in the Valhalla Ranges, with the highest being Gladsheim Peak,  to the east-northeast. The nearest higher neighbor is Asgard Peak,  to the northeast.

Etymology
The name "Valhalla Mountains" first appeared in George Mercer Dawson's Geological Survey of Canada map published in 1890. Dawson applied names derived from Scandinavian mythology to several of the mountain ranges and peaks in Southern Kootenay. In keeping with the Valhalla theme, this peak's name was submitted February 1970 by Robert Dean of the Kootenay Mountaineering Club for consideration, and the toponym was officially adopted March 3, 1971, by the Geographical Names Board of Canada. According to Norse mythology, Midgard is the home of earth dwellers.

Climate
Based on the Köppen climate classification, Midgard Peak has a subarctic climate with cold, snowy winters, and mild summers. Winter temperatures can drop below −20 °C with wind chill factors below −30 °C. Precipitation runoff from the mountain drains into tributaries of the Slocan River.

Climbing Routes

Established climbing routes on Midgard Peak:

 North Ridge -  First ascent 1973
 South Ridge -

See also

Geography of British Columbia

References

External links
 Weather forecast: Midgard Peak
 Flickr photo: Midgard seen from Asgard
 Valhalla Range photo Midgard to right

Two-thousanders of British Columbia
Selkirk Mountains
Kootenay Land District